is a Japanese basketball player. He competed in the men's tournament at the 1960 Summer Olympics and the 1964 Summer Olympics.

References

External links
 

1940 births
Living people
Japanese men's basketball players
1963 FIBA World Championship players
Olympic basketball players of Japan
Basketball players at the 1960 Summer Olympics
Basketball players at the 1964 Summer Olympics
Sportspeople from Shizuoka Prefecture
Asian Games medalists in basketball
Asian Games silver medalists for Japan
Basketball players at the 1962 Asian Games
Medalists at the 1962 Asian Games